The 1987–88 BYU Cougars men's basketball team represented Brigham Young University as a member of the Western Athletic Conference during the 1987–88 basketball season. Led by head coach LaDell Andersen, the Cougars compiled a record of 26–6 (13–3 WAC) to finish atop the WAC regular season standings. The team played their home games at the Marriott Center in Provo, Utah, and finished took an unblemished record at home into the regular season finale (15–0) before losing to UTEP. BYU opened the season with 17 consecutive victories and rose to No. 3 in the AP poll. The Cougars received an at-large bid to the NCAA tournament. In the opening round, BYU defeated UNC Charlotte in overtime before losing to No. 5 seed Louisville in the round of 32, 97–76.

Roster

Schedule and results

|-
!colspan=9 style=| Regular Season

|-
!colspan=9 style=| WAC Tournament

|-
!colspan=9 style=| NCAA Tournament

Rankings

References

BYU Cougars men's basketball seasons
Byu
Byu